The Bigge Valley Railway is a 24-kilometre-long, single-tracked branch line from Finnentrop station via Attendorn and Olpe to Freudenberg in western Germany. It is non-electrified and the section of line from Olpe to Freudenberg is now closed. The section between Olpe and Finnentrop is regularly worked by local railway passenger services (SPNV). The line runs from Finnentrop to Wenden in the valley of the River Bigge.

From Finnentrop to Olpe the Bigge Valley Railway is operated as Route no. 442.

See also 
 History of rail transport in Germany

External links 
 [strecken/2864.htm Description of route 2864] in the NRWbahnarchiv by André Joost
 Photos of the tunnel portals and map showing the closed and new sections
 Photo comparison of Freudenberg station now and then at DSO, accessed on 5 February 2010

Railway lines in North Rhine-Westphalia
Olpe (district)